Chahar Gaveh (also Romanized as Chahār Gāveh; also known as Chahār Gāv and Chahār Kāveh) is a village in Miyan Ab-e Shomali Rural District, in the Central District of Shushtar County, Khuzestan Province, Iran. At the 2006 census, its population was 310, in 61 families.

References 

Populated places in Shushtar County